Aldrichiopa is a genus of flies in the family Tachinidae.

Species
Aldrichiopa coracella Aldrich, 1934

Distribution
Argentina, Chile.

References

Diptera of South America
Dexiinae
Tachinidae genera
Monotypic Brachycera genera